Séidou Barazé Guéro (born 20 October 1990) is a Beninese professional footballer who plays for SC Schiltigheim and the Benin national football team.

Career statistics

International

References

External links
 
 

1990 births
Living people
Beninese footballers
Benin international footballers
Association football defenders
Championnat National 2 players
Tonnerre d'Abomey FC players
Al-Nasr SC (Salalah) players
Mogas 90 FC players
Al-Fahaheel FC players
Al-Ittihad Club (Tripoli) players
Oulun Palloseura players
UMS Montélimar players
SC Schiltigheim players
2019 Africa Cup of Nations players
Kuwait Premier League players
Expatriate footballers in Kuwait
Expatriate footballers in Oman
Expatriate footballers in Morocco
Expatriate footballers in Libya
Expatriate footballers in Egypt
Expatriate footballers in Finland
Expatriate footballers in France
Kawkab Marrakech players
Botola players
Oman Professional League players
Beninese expatriate footballers
Beninese expatriate sportspeople in France
Beninese expatriate sportspeople in Kuwait
Beninese expatriate sportspeople in Oman
Beninese expatriate sportspeople in Morocco
Beninese expatriate sportspeople in Libya
Beninese expatriate sportspeople in Egypt
Beninese expatriate sportspeople in Finland
Hassania Agadir players
Pharco FC players
People from Abomey
Libyan Premier League players